Christine Cromwell is an American crime drama television series that aired as a rotating element of the ABC Mystery Movie. It debuted on November 11, 1989, and ended on February 17, 1990, with four episodes presented semi-monthly.

Premise and cast
Christine Cromwell, portrayed by Jaclyn Smith, is a lawyer for a prestigious law firm in San Francisco with cases that involve famous, wealthy people. She was valedictorian of her class in Harvard Law School and worked as a public defender for a decade.

Cromwell enjoys high-society activities with her mother, Samantha (Celeste Holm) and works in the law firm with senior partner Cyrus Blain (Ralph Bellamy). Other regulars were Sarah the secretary (Rebecca Cross) and Nanny the housekeeper (Ellen Albertini).

Dick Wolf was the executive producer.

Reaction
Mark Dawidziak, in an article distributed by Knight Ridder newspapers, praised the first episode's production values but described the plot as "horribly hackneyed." He added that the program went from fun in the first hour to being a dud in its conclusion.

Episodes

References

American Broadcasting Company original programming
The ABC Mystery Movie
1980s American crime drama television series
1990s American crime drama television series
1980s American mystery television series
1990s American mystery television series
1989 American television series debuts
1990 American television series endings
Television series created by Dick Wolf
Television series by Wolf Films
English-language television shows
Television series by Universal Television
Television shows set in San Francisco
Cromwell, Christine